Hans-Joachim Heyer (20 April 1922 – 9 November 1942) was a Luftwaffe ace and recipient of the Knight's Cross of the Iron Cross during World War II.  The Knight's Cross of the Iron Cross was awarded to recognise extreme battlefield bravery or successful military leadership.  Hans-Joachim Heyer was shot down near Leningrad, Russia on 9 November 1942.  He was posthumously awarded the Knight's Cross on 25 November 1942. During his career he was credited with 53 aerial victories, all of them on the Eastern Front.

Awards
 Flugzeugführerabzeichen
 Front Flying Clasp of the Luftwaffe in Gold
 Ehrenpokal der Luftwaffe (20 July 1942)
 Iron Cross (1939)
 2nd Class (7 July 1941)
 1st Class (30 November 1941)
 Wound Badge (1939)
 in Black (10 September 1942)
 German Cross in Gold on 4 August 1942 as Leutnant in the III./Jagdgeschwader 54
 Knight's Cross of the Iron Cross on 25 November 1942 as Leutnant and Flugzeugführer (pilot) in the III./Jagdgeschwader 54

References

Citations

Bibliography

External links
Aces of the Luftwaffe
TracesOfWar.com

1922 births
1942 deaths
People from Nordhausen (district)
Luftwaffe pilots
German World War II flying aces
Recipients of the Gold German Cross
Recipients of the Knight's Cross of the Iron Cross
Luftwaffe personnel killed in World War II
Aviators killed by being shot down
Military personnel from Thuringia